is a retired long-distance runner from Japan. She represented her native country in the women's marathon at the 1988 Summer Olympics in Seoul, South Korea. A gold medal winner at the 1986 Asian Games in Seoul, South Korea she won the 1994 edition of the Nagoya Marathon. She weighs 88Lb and is150 cm tall.

Achievements

References

External links
 

1959 births
Living people
Japanese female long-distance runners
Athletes (track and field) at the 1988 Summer Olympics
Olympic athletes of Japan
Olympic female marathon runners
Asian Games medalists in athletics (track and field)
Athletes (track and field) at the 1986 Asian Games
Japanese female marathon runners
Asian Games gold medalists for Japan
Medalists at the 1986 Asian Games
Bunkyo University alumni
20th-century Japanese women
21st-century Japanese women